Amnosia decora, the Ninja, is a butterfly of the family Nymphalidae (Pseudergolinae). It is found  in the Indomalayan realm. It is the sole member of the monotypic genus Amnosia.

Subspecies
A. d. decora
A. d. baluana  Fruhstorfer, 1894  Borneo 
A. d. petronia  Fruhstorfer, 1908  Borneo
A. d. martini  Honrath, 1892  Borneo
A. d. endamia  Grose-Smith  Sumatra
A. d. decorina  Fruhstorfer, 1894  Nias
A. d. perakana  Fruhstorfer, 1908  Peninsular Malaya

Biology
A. decora is found in lowland rain forest.

References

Cyrestinae
Butterflies described in 1849